Karađorđe Stadium is a multi-purpose stadium in Novi Sad, Vojvodina, Serbia. It is currently used mostly for football matches and is the home ground of FK Vojvodina. The stadium is one of the most modern stadiums in Serbia and has one of the best pitches in the country. The stadium has a total of 14,853 seats after new renovations were made in 2013. The stadium is also the home ground for the Serbian U-21 football team.

History
In late May 2007, the stadium was the site of Siniša Mihajlović's testimonial match. In 2009, the stadium was given a new athletic track, the southeast stand and a modern Philips scoreboard. After the reconstruction in 2009, it was the venue of the 2009 European Athletics Junior Championships and the 2011 UEFA European Under-17 Football Championship. In 2011, FK Vojvodina installed floodlights with strength of 1,400 lux. The largest attendance was on 1 March 1967 when Vojvodina played against Scottish side Celtic in the 1966–67 European Cup quarter-final. There were about 30,000 spectators.

Formerly, it was known as the Vojvodina Stadium or City Stadium (Serbian: Градски стадион, Gradski stadion). In 2007, the stadium was renamed to Karađorđe Stadium after Karađorđe "Black George", the leader of the First Serbian uprising. However, Karađorđe Stadium was in fact the older and original name of the stadium that was used from its foundation in 1924 until the end of the Second World War.

Recent upgrades and developments
In early 2012, the executive board announced further reconstructions of the Karađorđe stadium. Original plans included the construction of a new south stand, the reconstruction of the eastern and southwest stand. Finally, in May 2013, as a result of UEFA requirements for obtaining a license for UEFA Europa League participation, the city of Novi Sad agreed to an upgrade of the stadium that will take place through June 2013 in time for FK Vojvodina to host Europa League qualifying matches.

Notable events

International football matches

Concerts
Eros Ramazzotti - 5 July 2006

Gallery

See also
List of football stadiums in Serbia
Famous buildings in Novi Sad

References

External links

Buildings and structures in Novi Sad
Football venues in Serbia
Football venues in Serbia and Montenegro
Athletics (track and field) venues in Serbia and Montenegro
Football venues in Yugoslavia
Athletics (track and field) venues in Yugoslavia
FK Vojvodina
Multi-purpose stadiums in Serbia
Sports venues completed in 1924
1924 establishments in Serbia